Carmen Wiedenmann (born 25 November 1967) is a Slovenian former professional tennis player. During her career she represented Yugoslavia and was known by her birth name Karmen Škulj.

Biography
Škulj comes from a family with a history in tennis. Two uncles Aleksander and Borut both played competitively and her aunty Irena competed for Yugoslavia in the Federation Cup. The Škulj Tenis Center in Dobrova was established by the family.

From 1986 to 1988, Škulj appeared in a total of eight ties for the Yugoslavia Federation Cup team. She also represented Yugoslavia at the 1989 Hopman Cup, where she teamed up with Slobodan Živojinović.

Škulj has a niece, Maja Živec-Škulj, who played on the WTA Tour in the 1990s. Her son Luca featured on the ITF junior circuit and plays collegiate tennis for the University of Tennessee.

She is now known as Carmen Wiedenmann and works as a tennis trainer in Augsburg, Germany.

ITF Circuit finals

Singles (1–0)

Doubles (1–1)

References

External links
 
 
 

1967 births
Living people
Yugoslav female tennis players
Slovenian female tennis players
Slovenian emigrants to Germany
Hopman Cup competitors